Don't Shoot Me I'm Only the Piano Player is the sixth studio album by English musician Elton John. Released in January 1973 by DJM Records, it was the first of two studio albums he released in 1973 (the second was Goodbye Yellow Brick Road, released nine months later), and was his second straight No. 1 album in the US and first No. 1 album in the UK.

The lead single "Crocodile Rock" yielded John his first No. 1 single in both the US and Canada. "Daniel" was also a major hit from the album, giving him his second Canadian No. 1 single on the RPM Top Singles Chart and No. 2 on the US Billboard Hot 100 and reaching No. 4 in the UK, one place higher than achieved by "Crocodile Rock".

Background
The team returned to France to record at the Château d'Hérouville, also known at the time as "Strawberry Studios", which was how the studio was credited in the album's sleeve; Honky Château, the previous Elton John album, had been recorded there. The album featured horns arranged by producer Gus Dudgeon on "Elderberry Wine" (the B-side to "Crocodile Rock"), "Midnight Creeper" and "I'm Going to Be a Teenage Idol", the latter of which was inspired by John's friend, T-Rex frontman Marc Bolan. The horn players were the same ones who were used on Honky Château. Paul Buckmaster returned to add strings on "Blues for Baby and Me" and "Have Mercy on the Criminal". During his Australian concerts with the Melbourne Symphony Orchestra in 1986, John lauded Buckmaster's work on songs such as "Have Mercy on the Criminal", calling the string arrangements "revolutionary".

The title of the album came from friend and actor/comedian Groucho Marx. Elton was playing the piano at a party at Groucho's home; Groucho, who referred to him as 'John Elton', held out his middle and index finger in the style of a pistol. Elton then raised his hands and said "Don't shoot me, I'm only the piano player" at Marx's gun imitation.

The album was a huge hit on both sides of the Atlantic, topping the UK and US album charts. It is one of only three albums to feature just the core band of John on pianos and keyboards, Davey Johnstone on guitars, Dee Murray bass and Nigel Olsson on drums, without percussionist Ray Cooper. The other two are Honky Château (1972) (bar a performance by Cooper on congas on the song "Amy") and Breaking Hearts (1984).

An outtake of note was a re-recording of "Skyline Pigeon", which became the B-side to the single of "Daniel".

Critics at the time called some of the performances, especially "Crocodile Rock", derivative, which John freely acknowledged years later. In His Song: The Musical Journey of Elton John by author Elizabeth Rosenthal, John said "Crocodile Rock" was written as an overt homage to '50s records, and his vocal intentionally mimicked singer Bobby Vee. "High Flying Bird" was intended to sound like a Van Morrison record, and "Midnight Creeper" was a tip of the hat to the Rolling Stones.

John toured Australia during 1971 and was so inspired by Daddy Cool's hit single "Eagle Rock" that, with Taupin, he wrote "Crocodile Rock". The cover of this album has a photo of lyricist Taupin wearing a "Daddy Who?" promotional badge.

Don't Shoot Me... was also, according to John, the first album during which he felt comfortable experimenting with his vocal performances and style.

Packaging
The album's title comes from something Elton said during an evening spent with Groucho Marx.  After an evening of constant ribbing from Marx, Elton's comeback was to hold his hands up and say, "Don't shoot me, I'm only the piano player."   The album's cover photograph, which shows a young couple outside a movie theatre whose marquee reads: Don't Shoot Me I'm Only The Piano Player starring Elton John; on the wall is a movie poster advertising the Marx Brothers' 1940 film Go West as a tribute to Groucho Marx.

The title is also a play on the 1960 François Truffaut film Shoot the Piano Player and the original Oscar Wilde quote "Don't shoot the piano player, he's doing his best", which Wilde said he saw in a saloon on a visit to the U.S.

Track listing

Personnel 
Track numbers refer to CD and digital releases of the album.

 Elton John – vocals, Fender Rhodes (1, 5), mellotron (1, 2), acoustic piano (2-4, 6, 7, 9, 10), Leslie piano (7) harmonium (8), Farfisa organ (9)
 Ken Scott – ARP synthesizer (1)
 Davey Johnstone – acoustic guitar, electric guitar and Leslie guitar (All tracks); banjo (1), backing vocals (2, 7, 10), sitar (4), mandolin (8)
 Dee Murray – bass (All tracks), backing vocals (2, 7, 10)
 Nigel Olsson – drums (All tracks), maracas (1), backing vocals (2, 7, 10)
 Gus Dudgeon – brass arrangements (3, 5, 7)
 Paul Buckmaster – orchestral arrangements (4, 6)
 Jean-Louis Chautemps – saxophone (3, 5, 7)
 Alain Hatot – saxophone (3, 5, 7)
 Jacques Bolognesi – trombone (3, 5, 7)
 Ivan Jullien – trumpet (3, 5, 7)

Production 
 Producer – Gus Dudgeon
 Engineer – Ken Scott
 Remixed at Trident Studios (London, UK).
 Coordinator – Steve Brown
 Art Direction and Sleeve Design – David Larkham and Michael Ross
 Cover Photo – Ed Caraeff
 Booklet Photography – Ed Caraeff, Bryan Forbes, Maxine Taupin and Michael Ross.

Charts

Weekly charts

Year-end charts

Certifications

References

External links

Elton John albums
1973 albums
Albums arranged by Paul Buckmaster
Albums produced by Gus Dudgeon
DJM Records albums
MCA Records albums
Albums recorded at Trident Studios
Albums recorded in a home studio